White Turns Blue is the international debut album by Norwegian singer-songwriter Maria Mena, released in 2004 in the United States by Columbia Records. It consists of tracks from her first two albums, Another Phase and Mellow, and was specifically compiled for the American market. The album peaked at  102 on the Billboard 200 in the United States.

With the exception of "You're the Only One", all tracks are listed as a "US album version", although only the songs taken from Another Phase were re-recorded.

There are several versions of the album. The version released in Norway has the same standard track listing, but with the album art and photos of her previous album Mellow. The US, European, Mexican, Australian, and South African versions have the new artwork. The Indonesian cassette has the Mellow artwork. The Target exclusive edition has two bonus tracks, and a bonus DVD containing the music video to "You're The Only One", and an interview with Mena talking about the making of the album.

Track listing
All songs were written by Maria Mena and Arvid Solvang, except where noted

"You're the Only One" – 2:44 (Originally from Mellow)  
"Fragile (Free)" – 4:00 (Originally from Another Phase)
"Just a Little Bit" – 3:56 (Mellow)
"Blame It On Me" (Mena, Thomas Whoni) – 3:41 (Another Phase)
"My Lullaby" – 2:58 (Another Phase)
"Take You With Me" – 3:00 (Mellow)
"What's Another Day" – 2:57 (Mellow)
"Lose Control" – 2:41(Mellow)
"Shadow" (Mena, Whoni) – 3:40 (Mellow)
"Your Glasses" – 4:02 (Mellow)
"Sorry" – 2:52 (Mellow)
"A Few Small Bruises" – 3:55 (Mellow)
"You're the Only One" [acoustic][*] – 2:46 (Acoustic version exclusive to Target edition)
"Sleep to Dream" [*] – 3:58 (Another Phase)

[*] bonus track

Bonus DVD:

 "You're The Only One" (video)
 Behind the scenes with Maria Mena

Personnel
Maria Mena – vocals, background vocals
Jarle Bernhoft – background vocals
Havard Caspersen – acoustic guitar
Celsius – keyboard
Borren Flyen – drums
Steffen Isaksen – grand piano
Kjell Harald Litangen – acoustic guitar, baritone guitar
Elias Muri – background vocals
Christian Nystrom – keyboard
Børge Petersen Øverlier – acoustic guitar
Arvid Solvang – acoustic guitar, piano, electric guitar, keyboard, background vocals, multi instruments, Fender Rhodes
Vemund Stavnes – bass
David Wallumrod – Fender Rhodes, Wurlitzer
Fredrik Wallumrod – drums

Production
Producer: Arvid Solvang 
Engineer: Arvid Solvang
Mixing: Andrew Dawson, Ulf Holand, Arvid Solvang
Mastering: James Cruz
A&R: Jørgen Bradtlie
Programming: Celsius, Arvid Solvang, Thomas Whoni
Sampling: Spectrasoncicsm, Miroslav Vitous
Arranger: Arvid Solvang
Art direction: Susanne Cerha
Design: Susanne Cerha
Photography: Susanne Cerha
Hair stylists: Dugg, Viveke Trønsdal
Stylist: Tommy Løland
Make-up: Linda Mehrens, Mikas

Charts
Album – Billboard (North America)

Singles – Billboard (North America)

References

 Information from CDON
 Maria Mena's Official Website

Maria Mena albums
2004 albums
Columbia Records albums